Shanavas K Bavakutty (born 5 July 1977) is an Indian film director from Ponnani in Malappuram district. His debut film was Kismath in 2016 and his second film  Thottappan released in 2019.

Career 
He won the Kerala State Film Award for Best Debut Director in 2016 for Kismath. The film was released on 29 July 2016 by Lal Jose through LJ Films. It was well received.

His second feature film was Thottappan, based on a short story written by Francis Norohna released on 5 July 2019. It depicts the affection between a girl and her godparent.

Filmography

Feature films

Short films

References

External links
 
 
 
 
 

Living people
Malayalam film directors
People from Malappuram district
21st-century Indian film directors
Film directors from Kerala
1977 births